Argyresthia laevigatella is a moth of the family Yponomeutidae. It is found in Europe and Japan.

The wingspan is 9–13 mm. It is very similar to Argyresthia glabratella. Certain identification requires dissection of the genitalia.

The moths are on wing from May to July depending on the location.

The larvae feed on Larix decidua.

References

External links
 Ukmoths
lepiforum.de 

Moths described in 1851
Taxa named by Gustav Heinrich Heydenreich
Argyresthia
Moths of Japan
Moths of Europe